Hanadi Tayseer Abdul Malek Jaradat (September 22, 1975 – October 4, 2003), a Palestinian militant from Jenin, blew herself up on Saturday, October 4, 2003 in a suicide attack on Maxim restaurant in the northern Israeli city of Haifa. Twenty-one people were killed and 51 injured.  Among the dead were four Israeli children, including an infant, and three Arabs.  She was the sixth female suicide bomber of the Al-Aqsa Intifada and the second woman recruited by Islamic Jihad.

Bombing
At the time of her suicide bombing attack, Jaradat was a law student due to qualify as a lawyer in a few weeks.  She had studied law at Yarmouk University in Jordan. Jaradat reportedly carried out the bombing in Haifa as an act of revenge after Israel Defense Forces undercover operatives in Jenin killed her cousin (Salah, 34) and her younger brother (Fadi, 25), both of whom were members of Islamic Jihad, with her cousin being considered to be a senior member of the Al-Quds Brigades group. Earlier, when she was 21, her fiancé had been killed by Israeli security forces.  Following the killing of her cousin and brother, Jaradat went into mourning and began study of the Koran and fasting two days a week.

The bomb included metal fragments packed around the explosive core, that sprayed around the restaurant, maximizing lethal effect. According to Haifa police sources, the aftermath was gruesome, with some of the dead still sitting upright at their tables, while others, including children and babies, were slammed against the walls. Due to the force of the explosion, all that remained of Jaradat was her head.

In response to his daughter's actions, her father Taisir said "My daughter's action reflected the anger that every Palestinian feels at the occupation. The occupation did not have mercy on my son Fadi, her brother. They killed him even though he was not a wanted person, they murdered him in cold blood before Hanadi's eyes." He declined all condolences, instead saying that he was proud of what his daughter had done, and that "I will accept only congratulations for what she did.  This was a gift she gave me, the homeland and the Palestinian people. Therefore, I am not crying for her. Even though the most precious thing has been taken from me."

In reprisal for the suicide bombing, Israeli forces conducted a raid at 3:00 a.m. on October 5, 2003, during the course of which they demolished the family home of Jaradat and the houses of two of her neighbours.

Victims

Honors and awards
Jaradat was proclaimed by the Islamic Jihad as the "Bride of Haifa" to honor her "marriage to the soil of her homeland", an honor previously reserved only to men. Within several days of the bombing, trophy cards with her picture, labelled "Hanadi the Bride of Haifa", were being handed out in Gaza.

In 2005, the Palestinian daily Al-Ayyam published a special supplement entitled "What Did Hanadi Say", consisting of poems honoring Jaradat and calling for Jihad.

In October 2012, the Arab Lawyers Union presented their top award to Hanadi Jaradat, and sent a delegation to her family to present them with the award.  Ayman Abu Eisheh, who is a member of the Palestine Committee at the Arab Lawyers Union, explained that the ALU were proud of Jaradat, and that her suicide bombing was "in defense of Palestine and the Arab nation."

Snow White and The Madness of Truth

Jaradat was the subject of Snow White and The Madness of Truth, a controversial item of installation art by Swedish, Israeli-born composer and musician Dror Feiler, and his Swedish wife, artist Gunilla Sköld-Feiler.

The installation consisted of a portrait of Hanadi Jaradat floating on a small white boat named "Snövit" ("Snow White") in a long pool of blood red water. This tableau was accompanied by written text on nearby walls and the sound of Bach's Cantata 199, Mein Herze schwimmt im Blut, BWV 199 (English: My heart swims in blood). Translated into English, Cantata 199 begins, "My heart swims in blood / because the brood of my sins / in God's holy eyes / makes me into a monster".

The artwork became the centre of controversy when the Israeli ambassador to Sweden, Zvi Mazel, vandalized the installation. After pushing some lightstands into the pool, causing a short-circuit and disabling the light, Mazel told Feiler that "This is not a work of art. This is an expression of hatred for the Israeli people. This has glorified suicide bombers". Further he said to the press that the piece constituted a "complete legitimization of genocide, the murder of innocent people, innocent civilians, under the guise of culture". Feiler rejected charges that their intention was to glorify suicide bombers and accused Mazel of "practicing censorship". He said the installation was made to "call attention to how weak people left alone can be capable of horrible things". Following the incident, Mazel was unrepentant, and said: "I was standing before an exhibit calling for genocide, praising the genocide of me, you, my brothers and sisters."

References 

1975 births
2003 suicides
Suicide bombing in the Israeli–Palestinian conflict
Palestinian militants
Islamic Jihad Movement in Palestine members
Palestinian female murderers
Female suicide bombers
College students who committed suicide
People from Jenin
Palestinian mass murderers
Suicide bombers in Israel